Chessman may refer to:

Caryl Chessman (1921–1960), American criminal and author, recipient of the death penalty
Chessman (wrestler), professional wrestler with AAA
Chess piece

See also
Cheeseman, a surname